The Best Show with Tom Scharpling (formerly The Best Show on WFMU) is a combination music, call-in, and comedy Internet radio show/podcast  hosted independently by Tom Scharpling since 2014, which previously aired on New Jersey-based radio station WFMU from 2000 to 2013. The show's slogan is "three hours of mirth, music, and mayhem."

The Best Show on WFMU first aired on October 10, 2000, occupying the 9pm–11pm time slot. Starting June 5, 2001, the show was expanded to three hours filling the 8pm–11pm slot, later moving to 9pm–midnight on June 15, 2010. A worldwide audience listened to the show live through WFMU's Internet stream with episodes also archived on the radio station's website. The Best Show began podcasting its shows, with the music removed due to licensing restrictions, on January 26, 2006. In October 2013, Scharpling announced his intention to end The Best Show within several months, with the program's finale airing on December 17. About one year later on December 16, 2014, Scharpling revived the program independently at thebestshow.net. The current incarnation of The Best Show continues to air on Tuesday nights from 9pm to midnight Eastern. On December 27, 2016, the show began accepting donations through Patreon.

The show has an international audience, with listeners and callers from the United States, Canada, the U.K., Sweden, Japan, New Zealand, and Tasmania. Regular callers and in-studio guests of note have included Todd Barry, Andy Kindler, Aimee Mann, Kurt Vile, Paul F. Tompkins, Ted Leo, John Hodgman, and Patton Oswalt.

Background
Superchunk drummer Jon Wurster is a frequent caller to the show, adopting a variety of personae hailing from the fictional and surreal New Jersey suburb of "Newbridge."  Frequent Wurster characters include "Philly Boy Roy" (an unflinching supporter of all things Philadelphia), "Timmy von Trimble" (a genetically modified, two-inch-tall racist), and "The Gorch" (a senior citizen from York, Pennsylvania, who claims that the character of The Fonz on the TV show Happy Days was based on him, without permission). Some of these calls have been released on CD by Scharpling and Wurster's Stereolaffs label.

Guests
Comedians

Fred Armisen 
Tim and Eric 
Zach Galifianakis 
Neil Hamburger 
Todd Barry 
Louis C.K.
Paul F. Tompkins 
Jim Gaffigan 
Patton Oswalt 
John Oliver 
Andrew Daly 
John Mulaney 
Jen Kirkman 
Aziz Ansari 
Paul Scheer 
Robert Popper 
Martin Short 
Chris Elliott 
Dana Snyder 
Dave Willis 
H. Jon Benjamin 
 Sam Seder 
Jon Glaser 
DC Pierson 
Julie Klausner 
Chris Gethard
Vanessa Bayer 
Marc Maron 
Bob Odenkirk 
Horatio Sanz 
Ian Roberts 
Dave Hill 
Matt Walsh 
Noel Fielding 
Julian Barratt 
Kristen Schaal
Gregg Turkington
Brett Gelman
Joe Mande
Gabe Delahaye
Jon Daly 
Rob Huebel
Kevin McDonald
Hayes Davenport
Nathan Fielder
Adam Pally
Jonah Ray
Andy Breckman
Sal Vulcano
Mary Houlihan
Brett Davis
Andrew "Dice" Clay
Jo Firestone
Scott Thompson
Derrick Beckles
James Adomian
Yakov Smirnoff
Alice Wetterlund

Actors

Jerry Ferrara
Ellie Kemper
Molly Shannon
Lisa Jane Persky
Kevin Corrigan
Paul Rudd
Jack Black
Illeana Douglas
Sharon Horgan
Patricia Arquette
John Ross Bowie
Griffin Newman
James Urbaniak

Musicians

Ted Leo 
Ben Gibbard 
Aimee Mann
Jon Auer 
Andrew W.K. 
Luther "Uncle Luke" Campbell 
Boss Hog
Kurt Vile
Carl Newman 
members of the Danielson Familie 
Dave Wyndorf
Steve Albini 
Mikal Cronin
Nick Thorburn
Mike Krol
Damian Abraham
Neil Hagerty
Syl Johnson
Nellie McKay
Greg Cartwright
James Murphy
David Crosby
Jon Spencer
 Cristina Martinez
MGMT
Miss Alex White
Kim Gordon
Mary Lattimore

Filmmakers

Don Coscarelli 
Bradley Beesley 
Kevin Smith
Jeff Feuerzeig
Jason Woliner
Peyton Reed
Danny Plotnick
  Robert Hatch-Miller
Lance Bangs
Todd Haynes
Lynn Shelton

Animators

Rebecca Sugar
Ian Jones-Quartey
Pendleton Ward
Genndy Tartakovsky

Authors 

Neal Pollack 
Paul Collins
Andrew Earles *
Michael Azerrad 
John Hodgman 
Matt Fraction 
Michael Kupperman 
David Rees 
Rob Schrab
Bob Mehr
Chip Zdarsky
Andy Zax

On February 11, 2003, Janeane Garofalo and Sam Seder appeared on The Best Show to discuss the political atmosphere of America. The chemistry between them as radio talents was evident, and their agreement on many liberal political views made them kindred spirits. In the summer of that same year, Garofalo was approached by representatives of Air America Radio to be a radio personality for their programming. She insisted that they hire Seder and that he share the hosting responsibilities. Less than one year later, The Majority Report was born.

Legacy

Big Dipper reunion
On his January 20, 2004 radio program, Scharpling had been derisively talking about the VH1 show Bands Reunited. This discussion led to Scharpling facetiously declaring his goal of reuniting the beloved (though relatively unknown) 1980s Boston indie-rock band Big Dipper. In the following weeks, the concept of a "Big Dipper Reunion" had become a recurring in-joke on the program. Scharpling began calling the members at home to convince them to reunite. In 2008, the group reunited for a live concert.  In advance of several reunion shows in April 2008, Merge Records released the 3-disc Supercluster: The Big Dipper Anthology on March 18, featuring liner notes by Scharpling.

TV special
In 2014, Scharpling and Wurster created and produced a television special for Adult Swim (as part of their project Infomercials), based around their characters and the town of Newbridge entitled The Newbridge Tourism Board Presents: "We're Newbridge, We're Comin' to Get Ya!". It aired on November 3, 2014, and presents itself as a tourism video advertising Newbridge, NJ.

The Best of The Best Show
Released by The Numero Group on May 12, 2015, The Best of The Best Show is a retrospective box set of Scharpling and Wurster calls, culled primarily from the show's 13-year run on WFMU, on 16 discs and a USB stick with bonus material. It also includes a book featuring essays written by friends and associates of the show and notes on every included call by Scharpling and Wurster themselves.

24/7 stream
On January 1, 2017, a 24/7 streaming channel was added to the official Best Show website featuring clips from the shows entire run, both the WFMU and independent eras, along with rare and previously unheard material.

Spin-offs and Patreon exclusives

Best Show Gems/Best Show Bests

On February 23, 2009, a spin-off program titled Best Show Gems began podcasting once every other week. The podcast is a "greatest hits"-type program featuring highlights from The Best Show. Best Show Gems ranges anywhere from 15 to 60 minutes, and usually centers on a call between Scharpling and Wurster. The podcast continues on as Best Show Bests, featuring Scharpling & Wurster calls and celebrity interviews from the modern show, released Fridays on the same feed as the show proper.

The Half Hour of Power 
The Half Hour of Power is an overtime show, typically recorded every other week directly following The Best Show. During the show, Tom and the Best Show crew will take unscreened calls and discuss events from their personal lives.

Meet My Friends the Friends 
Patreon exclusive featuring a fictionalized version of Scharpling hosting a Friends recap podcast as his life slowly begins to unravel. The podcast has currently covered up through the third season of the show.

So Far 
Patreon exclusive limited podcast in which the Best Show crew takes a year by year look at all of the works of Crosby, Stills, Nash & Young, together and apart.

One-offs and infrequent releases

Gary The Squirrel podcasts 
Patreon exclusives wherein Gary the Squirrel, a Don Rickles-esque squirrel portrayed by Scharpling conducts interviews, trains the Best Show staff on improv or broadcasting, and comments on pop culture.

The Sad Mirage 
Scharpling and "AP Mike" Lisk discuss various somber topics.

Lights Out 
The Best Show staff share ghost stories, nightmares, and various other horror-related occurrences in their lives with the lights out in the studio.

Takin' the Leap with Jason Gore 
A podcast within the Meet My Friends the Friends universe wherein producer Jason Gore hosts a Quantum Leap recap podcast.

Reception and fan base
Notable fans of The Best Show include Conan O'Brien, David Cross, and Aiden English.

See also
Scharpling & Wurster
 List of The Best Show with Tom Scharpling episodes

References

External links
Official Website
The Best Show on WFMU with Tom Scharpling Archives
Stereolaffs
Written recaps at Recidivism.org
Best Show Gems: The Best of the Best Show
The Newbridgctionary (An episode-by-episode compendium of Best Show callers from the Newbridgiverse.)
Interview with Tom Scharpling and Jon Wurster on AST Radio (July 2, 2007)
Interview with Tom Scharpling on Gothamist (June 15, 2006)
Interview with Tom Scharpling on The Sound of Young America (Nov. 12, 2005)
Article from American Way magazine

American comedy radio programs